A kebab shop is a quick service food establishment specialising in various fast food and street food dishes, primarily doner kebab and related sandwiches, including falafel. 

Kebab shops were born in Europe, specifically Berlin with doner kebab brought by Turkish immigrants, as a natural evolution of influences from Greece into the United States in the early 1970s, where gyros, souvlakis and the like were served with fries and beer. Kebab shops have also spread to the United States, the United Kingdom, Canada, and Australia. Kebab Turki Baba Rafi from Indonesia is the world's largest chain of kebab shops, which operates more than 1,300 outlets.

References 

Fast food
Kebabs